The 2008 DFS Classic was a women's tennis tournament played on outdoor grass courts. It was the 27th edition of the DFS Classic, and was part of the Tier III Series of the 2008 WTA Tour. It took place at the Edgbaston Priory Club in Birmingham, United Kingdom, from 9 June until 15 June 2008. Twelfth-seeded Kateryna Bondarenko won the singles title and earned $31,000 first-prize money.

Finals

Singles

  Kateryna Bondarenko defeated  Yanina Wickmayer, 7–6(9–7), 3–6, 7–6(7–4)
It was Kateryna Bondarenko's 1st career title.

Doubles

 Cara Black /  Liezel Huber defeated  Séverine Brémond /  Virginia Ruano Pascual, 6–2, 6–1

External links
 Official website
 ITF tournament edition details
 Tournament draws

DFS Classic
Birmingham Classic (tennis)
Dfs Classic, 2008
DFS Classic
Birm